The UEFA Euro 2000 qualifying play-offs were the last round of qualifying competition for UEFA Euro 2000. They were contested by the eight lowest-ranked runners-up from the nine first round groups of the UEFA Euro 2000 qualifying tournament. The winners of each of four home and away ties qualified for the final tournament in Belgium and Netherlands. The matches were played on 13 and 17 November 1999.

Ranking of second-placed teams
The highest ranked second placed team from the groups qualified automatically for the tournament, while the remainder entered the playoffs. As the groups contained different numbers of teams, matches against the fifth and sixth-placed teams in each group were not included in this ranking. As a result, a total of six matches played by each team count toward the purpose of the second-placed ranking table.

Draw
The draw for the play-offs was held on 13 October 1999 in Aachen, Germany, to determine the four pairings as well as the order of the home and away ties. No seeding system was used, making the draw an open one. This decision was announced by UEFA the day before the draw was made.

Summary

|}

Matches

England won 2–1 on aggregate.

Denmark won 8–0 on aggregate.

Slovenia won 3–2 on aggregate.

1–1 on aggregate. Turkey won on away goals.

Goalscorers

References

UEFA Euro 2000 qualifying
1999–2000 in Israeli football
1999–2000 in Scottish football
play
Play
1999–2000 in Turkish football
1999–2000 in Republic of Ireland association football
1999–2000 in Ukrainian football
1999–2000 in Slovenian football
England–Scotland football rivalry
Slovenia at UEFA Euro 2000
Turkey at UEFA Euro 2000
November 1999 sports events in Europe